Nurses is an American sitcom television series that aired on NBC from September 14, 1991, to May 7, 1994, created and produced by Susan Harris as a spin-off of Empty Nest, which itself was a spin-off of The Golden Girls.

Synopsis
The series revolved around a group of nurses working at the same Miami hospital as Empty Nests Dr. Harry Weston. Initially, the main characters were strong-willed nurse Annie Roland (Arnetia Walker), sarcastic nurse Sandy Miller (Stephanie Hodge), dim-witted nurse Julie Milbury (Mary Jo Keenen) and Latina nurse Gina Cuevas (Ada Maris) who frequently reminisced about her homeland, the fictional San Pequeño. Also in the cast were arrogant Dr. Hank Kaplan (Kip Gilman), wise-cracking orderly Paco Ortiz (Carlos Lacamara) and flaky nurse Greg Vincent (Jeff Altman).  Florence Stanley had a recurring role during the first season as Dr. Riskin.

Changes were made after the first season in an effort to boost ratings. David Rasche joined the cast in the second season as Jack Trenton, a slimy white-collar criminal forced to perform community service at the hospital, and in the final season Loni Anderson joined the cast as new hospital administrator Casey McAfee. Other changes included the addition of Markus Flanagan as hunky orderly Luke Fitzgerald for the second season only, the changing of the show's theme song in seasons two and three, having nurse Gina and Dr. Hank Kaplan get married (Gina being pregnant by Dr. Hank). Nurse Greg Vincent was also written off after season one.

In the series' final season, nurse Sandy was gone, and the series' focus moved increasingly from the nurses to Casey McAfee's adjustments in running the hospital under a new HMO, and the antics of Jack Trenton and his sidekick Paco the orderly.

Cast
 Stephanie Hodge as Nurse Sandy Miller (1991–1993)
 Arnetia Walker as Nurse Annie Roland
 Mary Jo Keenen as Nurse Julie Milbury
 Jeff Altman as Greg Vincent (1991–1992)
 Ada Maris as Gina Cuevas
 Kip Gilman as Dr. Hank Kaplan (credited in Season 1 as Kenneth David Gilman)
 Carlos Lacámara as Paco Ortiz
 Florence Stanley as Dr. Riskin (1991–1992)
 Markus Flanagan as Luke Fitzgerald (1992–1993)
 David Rasche as Jack Trenton (1992–1994)
 Loni Anderson as Casey MacAfee (1993–1994)

Episodes

Crossovers
The following is a list of Nurses episodes featuring characters from The Golden Girls and Empty Nest.
Season One
Episode 2: "A Lesson in Life" – Laverne Todd from Empty Nest
Episode 6: "Mother, Jugs, and Zach" – Harry Weston from Empty Nest
Episode 9: "Begone with the Wind" – Rose Nylund from The Golden Girls and Laverne Todd from Empty Nest
Episode 20: "Moon Over Miami" – Blanche Devereaux from The Golden Girls and Charley Dietz from Empty Nest
Season Two
Episode 2: "In My New Country" – Laverne Todd from Empty Nest
Episode 7: "Playing Doctor" – Carol Weston from Empty Nest
Season Three
Episode 1: "The Eagle Has Landed" – Harry Weston from Empty Nest
Episode 4: "Jack's Indecent Proposal" – Charley Dietz from Empty Nest
Episode 7: "The Bridges of Dade Country" – Harry Weston from Empty Nest
Episode 9: "Temporary Setbacks" – Sophia Petrillo from The Golden Girls and Empty Nest, and Carol Weston from Empty Nest
Episode 10: "The Birth of a Marriage" – Harry Weston from Empty Nest

References

External links
 

1991 American television series debuts
1994 American television series endings
1990s American sitcoms
1990s American medical television series
1990s American workplace comedy television series
American television spin-offs
English-language television shows
Works about nursing
NBC original programming
Television shows set in Miami
Television series by ABC Studios
The Golden Girls